A swimming pool, swimming bath, wading pool, paddling pool, or simply pool, is a structure designed to hold water to enable swimming or other leisure activities. Pools can be built into the ground (in-ground pools) or built above ground (as a freestanding construction or as part of a building or other larger structure), and may be found as a feature aboard ocean-liners and cruise ships. In-ground pools are most commonly constructed from materials such as concrete, natural stone, metal, plastic, or fiberglass, and can be of a custom size and shape or built to a standardized size, the largest of which is the Olympic-size swimming pool.

Many health clubs, fitness centers, and private clubs have pools used mostly for exercise or recreation. It is common for municipalities of every size to provide pools for public use. Many of these municipal pools are outdoor pools but indoor pools can also be found in buildings such as natatoriums and leisure centers. Hotels may have pools available for their guests to use at their own leisure. Pools as a feature in hotels are more common in tourist areas or near convention centers. Educational facilities such as high schools and universities sometimes have pools for physical education classes, recreational activities, leisure, and competitive athletics such as swimming teams. Hot tubs and spas are pools filled with water that is heated and then used for relaxation or hydrotherapy. Specially designed swimming pools are also used for diving, water sports, and physical therapy, as well as for the training of lifeguards and astronauts. Swimming pools most commonly use chlorinated water, or salt water, and may be heated or unheated.

History

Pre-modern
The "Great Bath" at the site of Mohenjo-Daro in modern-day Pakistan was most likely the first swimming pool, dug during the 3rd millennium BC.

Ancient Greeks and Romans built artificial pools for athletic training in the palaestras, for nautical games and for military exercises. Roman emperors had private swimming pools in which fish were also kept, hence one of the Latin words for a pool was piscina. The first heated swimming pool was built by Gaius Maecenas in his gardens on the Esquiline Hill of Rome, likely sometime between 38 and 8 BC. Gaius Maecenas was a wealthy imperial advisor to Augustus and considered one of the first patrons of arts.

Ancient Sinhalese built a pair of pools called "Kuttam Pokuna" in the kingdom of Anuradhapura, Sri Lanka, in the 6th century AD. They were decorated with flights of steps, punkalas or pots of abundance, and scroll design.

19th century
Swimming pools became popular in Britain in the mid-19th century. As early as 1837, six indoor pools with diving boards existed in London, England. The Maidstone Swimming Club in Maidstone, Kent is believed to be the oldest surviving swimming club in Britain. It was formed in 1844, in response to concerns over drownings in the River Medway, especially since would-be rescuers would often drown because they themselves could not swim to safety. The club used to swim in the River Medway, and would hold races, diving competitions and water polo matches. The South East Gazette July 1844 reported an aquatic breakfast party: coffee and biscuits were served on a floating raft in the river. The coffee was kept hot over a fire; club members had to tread water and drink coffee at the same time. The last swimmers managed to overturn the raft, to the amusement of 150 spectators.

The Amateur Swimming Association was founded in 1869 in England, and the Oxford Swimming Club in 1909. The presence of indoor baths in the cobbled area of Merton Street might have persuaded the less hardy of the aquatic brigade to join. So, bathers gradually became swimmers, and bathing pools became swimming pools. In 1939, Oxford created its first major public indoor pool at Temple Cowley.

The modern Olympic Games started in 1896 and included swimming races, after which the popularity of swimming pools began to spread. In the US, the Racquet Club of Philadelphia clubhouse (1907) boasts one of the world's first modern above-ground swimming pools. The first swimming pool to go to sea on an ocean liner was installed on the White Star Line's Adriatic in 1906. The oldest known public swimming pool in the U.S., Underwood Pool, is located in Belmont, Massachusetts.

Interest in competitive swimming grew following World War I. Standards improved and training became essential. Home swimming pools became popular in the United States after World War II and the publicity given to swimming sports by Hollywood films such as Esther Williams' Million Dollar Mermaid made a home pool a desirable status symbol. More than 50 years later, the home or residential swimming pool is a common sight. Some small nations enjoy a thriving swimming pool industry (e.g., New Zealand pop. 4,116,900 – holds the record in pools per capita with 65,000 home swimming pools and 125,000 spa pools).

A two-storey, white concrete swimming pool building composed of horizontal cubic volumes built in 1959 at the Royal Roads Military College is on the Registry of Historic Places of Canada.

World records

According to the Guinness World Records, the largest swimming pool in the world is San Alfonso del Mar Seawater pool in Algarrobo, Chile. It was completed in December 2006.

The largest indoor wave pool in the world is at DreamWorks Water Park within the American Dream shopping and entertainment complex at the Meadowlands Sports Complex in East Rutherford, New Jersey, United States, and the largest indoor pool in North America is at the Neutral Buoyancy Lab in the Sonny Carter Training Facility at NASA JSC in Houston.

In 2021, Deep Dive Dubai, located in Dubai, UAE, was certified by the Guinness Book of World Records as the world's deepest swimming pool reaching . The Y-40 swimming pool at the Hotel Terme Millepini in Padua, Italy, previously held the record, from 2014 until 2021.

The Fleishhacker Pool in San Francisco was the largest heated outdoor swimming pool in the United States. Opened on 23 April 1925, it measured  and was so large that the lifeguards required kayaks for patrol. It was closed in 1971 due to low patronage.

One of the largest swimming pools ever built was reputedly created in Moscow after the Palace of Soviets remained uncompleted. The foundations of the palace were converted into the Moskva Pool open-air swimming pool after the process of de-Stalinisation. However, after the fall of communism, Christ the Saviour Cathedral was re-built  on the site between 1995 and 2000; the cathedral had originally been located there.

The highest swimming pool is believed to be in Yangbajain (Tibet, China). This resort is located at  AMSL and has two indoor swimming pools and one outdoor swimming pool, all filled with water from hot springs.

Dimensions 
See: Competition pools (below)

Length: Most pools in the world are measured in metres, but in the United States pools are often measured in feet and yards. In the UK most pools are calibrated in metres, but older pools measured in yards still exist. In the US, pools tend to either be 25 yards (SCY-short course yards), 25 metres (SCM-short course metres) or 50 metres (long course). US high schools and the NCAA conduct short course (25 yards) competition. There are also many pools  m long, so that 3 lengths = 100 m. This pool dimension is commonly used to accommodate water polo.

USA Swimming (USA-S) swims in both metric and non-metric pools. However, the international standard is metres, and world records are only recognized when swum in 50 m pools (or 25 m for short course) but 25-yard pools are very common in the US.   In general, the shorter the pool, the faster the time for the same distance, since the swimmer gains speed from pushing off the wall after each turn at the end of the pool.

Width: Most European pools are between 10 m and 50 m wide.

Depth: The depth of a swimming pool depends on the purpose of the pool, and whether it is open to the public or strictly for private use. Most public pools have differing depths to accommodate different swimmer requirements. In many jurisdictions, it is a requirement to show the water depth with clearly marked depths affixed to the pool walls.

Types 
Pools can be either indoors or outdoors. They can be of any size and shape, and inground or above ground. Most pools are permanent fixtures, while others are temporary, collapsible structures.

Private pools 

Home pools can be permanently built-in, or be assembled above ground and disassembled after summer. Privately owned outdoor pools in backyards or gardens started to proliferate in the 1950s in regions with warm summer climates, particularly in the United States with desegregation.

Construction methods for private pools vary greatly. The main types of in-ground pools are gunite shotcrete, concrete, vinyl-lined, and one-piece fiberglass shells.

Many countries now have strict pool fencing requirements for private swimming pools, which require pool areas to be isolated so that unauthorized children younger than six years cannot enter. Many countries require a similar level of protection for the children residing in or visiting the house, although many pool owners prefer the visual aspect of the pool in close proximity to their living areas, and will not provide this level of protection. There is no consensus between states or countries on the requirements to fence private swimming pools, and in many places they are not required at all, particularly in rural settings.

Children's pools 

Inexpensive temporary polyvinyl chloride pools can be bought in supermarkets and taken down after summer. They are used mostly outdoors in yards, are typically shallow, and often their sides are inflated with air to stay rigid. When finished, the water and air can be let out and this type of pool can be folded up for convenient storage. They are regarded in the swimming pool industry as "splasher" pools intended for cooling off and amusing toddlers and children, not for swimming, hence the alternate name of "kiddie" pools.

Toys are available for children and other people to play with in pool water. They are often blown up with air so they are soft but still reasonably rugged, and can float in water.

Public pools 

Public pools are often part of a larger leisure center or recreational complex. These centres often have more than one pool, such as an indoor heated pool, an outdoor (chlorinated, saltwater or ozonated) pool which may be heated or unheated, a shallower children's pool, and a paddling pool for toddlers and infants. There may also be a sauna and one or more hot tubs or spa pools ("jacuzzis").

Many upscale hotels and holiday resorts have a swimming pool for use by their guests. If a pool is in a separate building, the building may be called a natatorium. The building may sometimes also have facilities for related activities, such as a diving tank. Larger pools sometimes have a diving board affixed at one edge above the water.

Many public swimming pools are rectangles 25 m or 50 m long, but they can be any size and shape. There are also elaborate pools with artificial waterfalls, fountains, splash pads, wave machines, varying depths of water, bridges, and island bars.

Some swimming facilities have lockers for clothing and other belongings. The lockers can require a coin to be inserted in a slot, either as deposit or payment. There are usually showers – sometimes mandatory – before and/or after swimming. There are often also lifeguards to ensure the safety of users.

Wading or paddling pools are shallow bodies of water intended for use by small children, usually in parks. Concrete wading pools come in many shapes, traditionally rectangle, square or circle. Some are filled and drained daily due to lack of a filter system. Staff chlorinate the water to ensure health and safety standards.

Competition pools 
 See: #Dimensions (above) and Swimming (sport)#Competition pools

Competition pools are generally indoors and heated to enable their use all year round, and to more easily comply with the regulations regarding temperature, lighting, and automatic officiating equipment.

An Olympic-size swimming pool (first used at the 1924 Olympics) is a pool that meets FINA's additional standards for the Olympic Games and for world championship events. Depth must be at least .

There are also regulations for color of lane rope, positioning of backstroke flags (5 metres from each wall), and so on. Pools claimed to be "Olympic pools" do not always meet these regulations, as FINA cannot police use of the term. Touchpads are mounted on both walls for long course meets and each end for short course.

A pool may be referred to as fast or slow, depending on its physical layout. Some design considerations allow the reduction of swimming resistance making the pool faster: namely, proper pool depth, elimination of currents, increased lane width, energy absorbing racing lane lines and gutters, and the use of other innovative hydraulic, acoustic and illumination designs.

Exercise pools 
In the last two decades, a new style of pool has gained popularity. These consist of a small vessel (usually about 2.5 × 5 m) in which the swimmer swims in place, either against the push of an artificially generated water current or against the pull of restraining devices. These pools have several names, such as swim spas, swimming machines, or swim systems. They are all examples of different modes of resistance swimming.

Hot tubs and spa pools 

Hot tubs and spa pools are common heated pools used for relaxation and sometimes for therapy. Commercial spas are common in the swimming pool area or sauna area of a health club or fitness center, in men's clubs, women's clubs, motels and exclusive five-star hotel suites. Spa clubs may have very large pools, some segmented into increasing temperatures. In Japan, men's clubs with many spas of different size and temperature are common. Commercial spas are generally made of concrete, with a mosaic tiled interior. More recently with the innovation of the pre-form composite method where mosaic tiles are bonded to the shell this enables commercial spas to be completely factory manufactured to specification and delivered in one piece. Hot tubs are typically made somewhat like a wine barrel with straight sides, from wood such as Californian redwood held in place by metal hoops. Immersion of the head is not recommended in spas or hot tubs due to a potential risk of underwater entrapment from the pump suction forces. However, commercial installations in many countries must comply with various safety standards which reduce this risk considerably.

Home spas are a worldwide retail item in western countries since the 1980s, and are sold in dedicated spa stores, pool shops, department stores, the Internet, and catalog sales books. They are almost always made from heat-extruded acrylic sheet Perspex, often colored in marble look-alike patterns. There is often a mid-depth seating or lounging system, and contoured lounger style reclining seats are common. Upmarket spas include various jet nozzles (massage, pulsating, etc.), a drinks tray, lights, LCD flat-screen TV sets and other features that make the pool a recreation center. Many pools are incorporated in a redwood or simulated wood surround, and are termed "portable" as they may be placed on a patio rather than sunken into a permanent location. Some portable spas are shallow and narrow enough to fit sideways through a standard door and be used inside a room. Low power electric immersion heaters are common with home spas.

Whirlpool tubs first became popular in the U.S. during the 1960s and 1970s. A spa is also called a "jacuzzi" there, as the word became a generic after-plumbing component manufacturer; Jacuzzi introduced the "spa whirlpool" in 1968. Air bubbles may be introduced into the nozzles via an air-bleed venturi pump that combines cooler air with the incoming heated water to cool the pool if the temperature rises uncomfortably high. Some spas have a constant stream of bubbles fed via the seating area of the pool, or a footwell area. This is more common as a temperature control device where the heated water comes from a natural (uncontrolled heat) geothermal source, rather than artificially heated. Water temperature is usually very warm to hot –  – so bathers usually stay in for only 20 to 30 minutes. Bromine or mineral sanitizers are often recommended as sanitizers for spas because chlorine dissipates at a high temperature, thereby heightening its strong chemical smell. Ozone is an effective bactericide and is commonly included in the circulation system with cartridge filtration, but not with sand media filtration due to clogging problems with turbid body fats.

Ocean pools 

In the early 20th century, especially in Australia, ocean pools were built, typically on headlands by enclosing part of the rock shelf, with water circulated through the pools by flooding from tidal tanks or by regular flooding over the side of the pools at high tide. This continued a pre-European tradition of bathing in rockpools with many of the current sites being expanded from sites used by Aboriginal Australians or early European settlers. Bathing in these pools provided security against both rough surf and sea life. There were often separate pools for women and men, or the pool was open to the sexes at different times with a break for bathers to climb in without fear of observation by the other sex. These were the forerunners of modern "Olympic" pools. A variation was the later development of sea- or harbour-side pools that circulated sea water using pumps. A pool of this type was the training ground for Australian Olympian Dawn Fraser.

There are currently about 100 ocean baths in New South Wales, which can range from small pools roughly 25 metres long and "Olympic Sized" (50m)  to the very large, such as the 50 × 100 m baths in Newcastle. While most are free, a number charge fees, such as the Bondi Icebergs Club pool at Bondi Beach. Despite the development of chlorinated and heated pools, ocean baths remain a popular form of recreation in New South Wales.

A semi-natural ocean pool exists on the central coast of New South Wales; it is called The Bogey Hole.

Infinity pools 

An infinity pool (also named negative edge or vanishing edge pool) is a swimming pool which produces a visual effect of water extending to the horizon, vanishing, or extending to "infinity". Often, the water appears to fall into an ocean, lake, bay, or other similar body of water. The illusion is most effective whenever there is a significant change in elevation, though having a natural body of water on the horizon is not a limiting factor.

Natural pools and ponds 
Natural pools were developed in central and western Europe in the early and mid-1980s by designers and landscape architects with environmental concerns. They have recently been growing in popularity as an alternative to traditional swimming pools. Natural pools are constructed bodies of water in which no chemicals or devices that disinfect or sterilize water are used, and all the cleaning of the pool is achieved purely with the motion of the water through biological filters and plants rooted hydroponically in the system. In essence, natural pools seek to recreate swimming holes and swimmable lakes, the environment where people feel safe swimming in a non-polluted, healthy, and ecologically balanced body of water.

Water in natural pools has many desirable characteristics. For example, red eyes, dried-out skin and hair, and bleached swimsuits associated with overly chlorinated water are naturally absent in natural pools. Natural pools, by requiring a water garden to be a part of the system, offer different aesthetic options and can support amphibious wildlife such as snails, frogs, and salamanders, and even small fish if desired.

Zero-entry swimming pools 

A zero-entry swimming pool, also called a beach entry swimming pool, has an edge or entry that gradually slopes from the deck into the water, becoming deeper with each step, in the manner of a natural beach. As there are no stairs or ladders to navigate, this type of entry assists older people, young children and people with accessibility problems (e.g., people with a physical disability) where gradual entry is useful.

Indoor pools 

Indoor pools are located inside a building with a roof and are insulated by at least three walls. Built for year-round swimming or training, they are found in all climate types. Since the buildings around indoor pools are insulated, heat escapes much less, making it less expensive to heat indoor pools than outdoor pools (all of whose heat escapes). Architecturally, an indoor pool may look like the rest of the building, but extra heating and ventilation and other engineering solutions are required to ensure comfortable humidity levels. In addition to drainage and automatic pool covers, there are a number of ways to remove humidity in the air that is present in any wet indoor environment. Efficient dehumidification in the indoor pool environment prevents structural damage, lowers energy costs for cooling or heating, and improves the indoor climate to provide a comfortable swimming environment.

Some colleges, universities, and high schools have buildings that use the term "natatorium" in their names, especially when the building houses more than just a swimming pool, for example a diving well or facilities for water polo. The word natatorium was borrowed from Late Latin "place for swimming" into English in New England in 1890.

Other uses 

Swimming pools are also used for events such as synchronized swimming, water polo, canoe polo and underwater sports such as underwater hockey, underwater rugby, finswimming and sport diving as well as for teaching diving, lifesaving and scuba diving techniques. They have also been used for specialist tasks such as teaching water-ditching survival techniques for aircraft and submarine crews and astronaut training. Round-cornered, irregular swimming pools, such as the Nude Bowl, were drained of water and used for vertical skateboarding.

Sanitation 

Levels of bacteria and viruses in swimming pool water must be kept low to prevent the spread of diseases and pathogens. Bacteria, algae and insect larvae can enter the pool if water is not properly sanitized. Pumps, mechanical sand filters, and disinfectants are often used to sanitise the water.

Chemical disinfectants, such as chlorine (usually as a hypochlorite salt, such as calcium hypochlorite) and bromine, are commonly used to kill pathogens. If not properly maintained, chemical sanitation can produce high levels of disinfection byproducts. Sanitized swimming pool water can theoretically appear green if a certain amount of iron salts or copper chloride are present in the water.

Acesulfame potassium has been used to estimate how much urine is discharged by swimmers into a pool. In a Canadian study it was estimated that swimmers had released 75 litres of urine into a large pool that had about 830,000 litres of water and was a third of the size of an olympic pool. Hot tubs were found to have higher readings of the marker. While urine itself is sterile, its degradation products may  lead to asthma.

Covers 

Swimming pool heating costs can be significantly reduced by using a pool cover. Use of a pool cover also can help reduce the amount of chemicals (chlorine, etc.) required by the pool. Outdoor pools gain heat from the sun, absorbing 75–85% of the solar energy striking the pool surface. Though a cover decreases the total amount of solar heat absorbed by the pool, the cover eliminates heat loss due to evaporation and reduces heat loss at night through its insulating properties. Most swimming pool heat loss is through evaporation.

The heating effectiveness of a cover depends on type. A transparent bubble cover is the most effective, as it allows the largest amount of solar flux into the pool itself. Thermal bubble covers are lightweight UV-stabilized floating covers designed to minimize heat loss on heated swimming pools. Typically they are only fitted in spring and fall (autumn) when the temperature difference between pool water and air temperature is greatest. When used consistently they can raise average pool temperatures of an outdoor pool by around 18 °Fahrenheit (11 °Celsius) when combined with a well sized solar pool heating system, or about 11° Fahrenheit (6 °Celsius) without a solar heater but with full sun exposure. Bubble covers are typically applied and removed by being rolled up on a device fitted to one side of the pool (see illustration). Covers fall apart after four or five years due to sun exposure, overheating in the sun while off the pool, and chlorine attacking the plastic. Bubble covers should be removed during superchlorination.

A vinyl cover absorbs more sunlight directly, allowing temperature to rise faster, but ultimately prevents the pool from reaching as high a temperature as a clear cover. Vinyl covers consist of a heavier material and have a longer life expectancy than bubble covers. Insulated vinyl covers are also available with a thin layer of flexible insulation sandwiched between two layers of vinyl. These covers are mandatory to be fitted to all pools in areas of Australia that have experienced drought since 2006. This is an effort to conserve water, as much water evaporates and transpires.

An alternative to a continuous sheet of pool covering is multiple floating disks which are deployed and removed disk by disk. They cover most of the surface of the pool and offer evaporation reduction similar to continuous covers. Various types are available, for example opaque (for UV resistance and possible reduced algal growth), transparent (for esthetics), heavy and solid (for wind resistance), light and inflatable (for ease of handling).

 Liquid covers
Liquid covers are also an option. They use a microscopically thin layer of liquid (such as cetyl alcohol) that sits on the water surface and reduces evaporation, which is one of the major sources of heat loss as well as water loss. Unlike other covers, the pool can be used while the liquid cover is in place, and the nontoxic material is safe for people as well as pumping/filtering systems. The liquid must be replenished regularly (monthly or more), and may not be effective in windy areas (since the wind will disperse the thin layer).

 Safety covers
These covers are typically attached all winter, by hooked bungee cords or hooked springs connected to the pool deck, and are usually made in a variety of materials including coated or laminated vinyl or polypropylene mesh. They are custom designed to stop leaf debris from entering the pool but more importantly they also provide safety for animals and small children when designed and installed properly. The custom safety cover was invented in 1957 by Fred Meyer Jr. of Meyco Pool Covers when he found a dead animal in his pool. Today covers are made to meet ASTM safety barrier standards and have kept animals, people and even large vehicles out of the pool. They are not popular in warmer climates, due to the five to ten minutes it takes to fit/remove them, making them inconvenient for repeated application and removal.

Pool cover automation 

A pool cover can be either manually, semi-automatically, or automatically operated. Manual covers can be folded and stored in an off site location. Pool cover reels can also be used to help manually roll up the pool cover. The reel, usually on wheels, can be rolled in or out of place.

Semi-automatic covers use a motor-driven reel system. They use electrical power to roll and unroll the cover, but usually require someone to pull on the cover when unrolling, or guide the cover onto the reel when rolling up the cover. Semi-automatic covers can be built into the pool deck surrounding the pool, or can use reels on carts.

Automatic covers have permanently mounted reels that automatically cover and uncover the pool at the push of a button. They are the most expensive option, but are also the most convenient. These reels can be run from either an external motor requiring a pit to be dug beside the pool or using an internal motor that spins the reel.

Some pool covers fit into tracks along the sides of the pool. This prevents anything or anybody from getting into the pool. They even support the weight of several people. They can be run manually, semi-automatically, or automatically. Safety covers may be required by inspectors for public pools.

Winterization 
In areas which reach freezing temperature, it is important to close a pool properly. This varies greatly between in-ground and above-ground pools. By taking steps to properly secure the pool, it lessens the likelihood that the superstructure will be damaged or compromised by freezing water.

Closing vinyl and fibreglass pools 

In preparation for freezing temperatures, an in-ground swimming pool's pipes must be emptied. An above-ground pool should also be closed, so that ice does not drag down the pool wall, collapsing its structure. The plumbing is sealed with air, typically with rubber plugs, to prevent cracking from freezing water. The pool is typically covered to prevent leaves and other debris from falling in. The cover is attached to the pool typically using a stretch cord, similar to a bungee cord, and hooks fitted into the pool surround. The skimmer is closed off or a floating device is placed into it to prevent it from completely freezing and cracking. Floating objects such as life rings or basketballs can be placed in the pool to avoid its freezing under the cover. Sand or DE filters must be backwashed, with the main drain plug removed and all water drained out. Drain plugs on the pool filter are removed after the filter has been cleaned. The pool pump motor is taken under cover. Winter chemicals are added to keep the pool clean. The innovation of a composite construction of fiberglass, with an epoxy coating and porcelain ceramic tiles has led to the pre-form, composite-type with significant advantages over older methods; however, it also has increased sensitivity to metal staining.

In climates where there is no risk of freezing, closing down the pool for winter is not so important. Typically, the thermal cover is removed and stored. Winter sunlight can create an algae mess when a cover that has been left on all winter is removed. The pool is correctly pH-balanced and super-chlorinated. One part algaecide for every 50,000 parts of pool water should be added, and topped up each month. The pool should be filtered for one to two hours daily to keep the automated chlorination system active.

Safety 

Pools pose a risk of drowning, which may be significant for swimmers who are inexperienced, suffer from seizures, or are susceptible to a heart or respiratory condition. Lifeguards are employed at most pools to execute water rescues and administer first aid as needed in order to reduce this risk.

Diving in shallow areas of a pool may also lead to significant head and neck injuries; diving, especially head-first diving, should be done in the deepest point of the pool, minimally , but desirably , deeper if the distance between the water and the board is great.

Pools also present a risk of death due to drowning, particularly in young children. In regions where residential pools are common, drowning is a major cause of childhood death. As a precaution, many jurisdictions require that residential pools be enclosed with fencing to restrict unauthorized access. Many products exist, such as removable baby fences. The evidence for floating alarms and window/door alarms to reduce the risk of drowning is poor. Some pools are equipped with computer-aided drowning prevention or other forms of electronic safety and security systems.

Suspended ceilings in indoor swimming pools are safety-relevant components. The selection of materials under tension should be done with care. Especially the selection of unsuitable stainless steels can cause problems with stress corrosion cracking.

Dress code 

In public swimming pools, dress code may be stricter than on public beaches, and in indoor pools stricter than outdoor pools. For example, in countries where women can be topless on the beach, this is often not allowed in a swimming pool, and a swimsuit must be worn. For men, wearing ordinary shorts and a T-shirt to go in the water at a beach may be considered acceptable, but pools usually require real swimsuits or other dedicated water wear. Swimming with regular clothes can potentially weigh a swimmer down should they need to be rescued. In France and some other European countries, board shorts are usually not allowed for "hygienic" reasons. In Nordic countries, in particular Iceland, rules about clothing and hygiene are especially strict. When diving from a high board, swimsuits are sometimes worn doubled up (one brief inside another) in case the outer suit tears on impact with the water.

See also 

 Automated pool cleaner
 Bather load
 Lido
 List of water games
 Neutral buoyancy pool
 Pool fence
 Pool noodle
 Respiratory risks of indoor swimming pools
 Swimming pool service technician
 Uniform Swimming Pool, Spa and Hot Tub Code
 Urine-indicator dye

References

External links 
 

 
Bodies of water
Garden features
Sports venues by type